Mount Cuba Astronomical Observatory  is an astronomical observatory is located at 1610 Hillside Mill Road, Greenville, Delaware, United States. This observatory is home to a 0.6-meter telescope used by the Delaware Astronomical Society, the University of Delaware, and the Whole Earth Telescope.
Associated with the Observatory is the Mt. Cuba Astronomy Group (MCAG).  The MCAG is composed of interested amateurs and engages in astronomy education and public outreach.  Meetings are held the second Tuesday of each month at the Mt. Cuba Astronomical Observatory.

A Sunquest sundial, designed and machined by Richard L. Schmoyer, is on the Mount Cuba Observatory grounds near the parking lot.  This mean time sundial automatically corrects for the equation of time through the use of an analemma-inspired gnomon.

See also
Mt. Cuba Center
List of astronomical observatories
Whole Earth Telescope

References

External links
Official Website
Delaware Asteroseismic Research Center
Mount Cuba Astronomical Observatory Clear Sky Clock Forecasts of observing conditions.

Astronomical observatories in Delaware
Buildings and structures in New Castle County, Delaware
Tourist attractions in New Castle County, Delaware